Robert Henry McBride (May 25, 1918 – December 26, 1983) was an American diplomat. He served as United States Ambassador to the Democratic Republic of the Congo from 1967 to 1969 and as United States Ambassador to Mexico from 1969 to 1974.

Biography

Early life
Robert Henry McBride was born in Aberdeen, Scotland to American parents, and attended schools in Spain and France. As a result, he spoke French and Spanish fluently. He graduated from Princeton University in 1940.

Career

He joined the United States Foreign Service in 1941, and served in embassies in Havana, Algiers, Naples, Port-au-Prince, Rabat, Paris and Madrid. He served as Ambassador to the Democratic Republic of the Congo from 1967 to 1969, and to Mexico from 1969 to 1974.

In 1974, he became a diplomat-in-residence at the University of Virginia in Charlottesville, Virginia. He sat on the board of directors of the Inter-American Council for Immigration and Development.

Personal life
He was married to Jacqueline McBride, and they had three children.

Bibliography
Mexico and the United States (editor; Englewood Cliffs, N.J.: Prentice Hall, 1981)

References

1918 births
1983 deaths
Princeton University alumni
Ambassadors of the United States to the Democratic Republic of the Congo
Ambassadors of the United States to Mexico
University of Virginia faculty
United States Foreign Service personnel
American expatriates in the United Kingdom
American expatriates in Spain
American expatriates in France
American expatriates in Cuba
American expatriates in Algeria
American expatriates in Italy
American expatriates in Haiti
American expatriates in Morocco
20th-century American diplomats